Sichard was a 9th century Italian monk.  He was the Abbot of Farfa from c.830 to 842. His abbacy corresponds with a drop in the number of property transactions involving Farfa, perhaps because "[its] wealth was by that time sufficient to cover major building at the abbey itself." Sichard added an oratory to the existing abbey.

On Sichard's death in 842, the Emperor Lothair I intervened to appoint Bishop Peter of Spoleto in charge of the abbey until an abbot, Hilderic, could be elected (844). Sichard's epitaph was copied into the Libellus constructionis Farfensis, the earliest history of Farfa, of which only a fragment survives in an eleventh-century lectionary. The rediscovery of most of the epitaph in 1959 demonstrates that the author of the Libellus was an accurate copyist.

Notes

842 deaths
Abbots of Farfa
Year of birth unknown